Ovipennis dudgeoni is a moth of the subfamily Arctiinae. It was described by Henry John Elwes in 1890. It is found in Sikkim, India.

References

Lithosiini
Moths described in 1890